Torna, nicknamed Éices or Éces ("the poet, sage"), was a legendary Irish poet of the 5th century, noted as "the last great bard of Pagan Ireland." He is not to be confused with Torna Éigeas, the 17th-century bard who figures in the Contention of the Bards.

He was the foster-father of the Irish kings Corc and Niall of the Nine Hostages, and to him is attributed the Lament for Corc and Niall of the Nine Hostages. In the tale Suidigud Tellaig na Cruachna ("The Settling of the Manor of Crúachan"), he is the author of a poem on famous men and women who were buried in the cemetery of Crúachan (Rathcroghan).

References
 1000 Years of Irish poetry, Kathleen Hoagland New York, 1947, pp. 6–8. .

5th-century writers
5th-century Irish people
Medieval Irish poets
Medieval Irish writers
Irish male poets
5th-century Irish writers